Mount Mackellar is a massive mountain,  high, standing at the head of Mackellar Glacier,  south of Pagoda Peak, in the Queen Alexandra Range, Antarctica. It was discovered by the British Antarctic Expedition, 1907–09, and named after Campbell Mackellar, a supporter of the expedition.

References

Mountains of the Ross Dependency
Shackleton Coast
Four-thousanders of Antarctica